The 1940 Kansas gubernatorial election was held on November 5, 1940. Incumbent Republican Payne Ratner defeated Democratic nominee William H. Burke with 49.63% of the vote.

General election

Candidates
Major party candidates
Payne Ratner, Republican
William H. Burke, Democratic

Other candidates
David C. White, Prohibition
Ida A. Beloof, Socialist

Results

References

1940
Kansas
Gubernatorial